Dharun Ayyasamy (born 31 December 1996) is an Indian track athlete. He specialises in the 400 metres and the 400 metres hurdles events. He participated in the 4 × 400 metres relay event at the 2016 Summer Olympics.

Early life
Dharun was born on 31 December 1996 in a village called Ravuthampalayam near Avinashi in Tiruppur district. When he was in fourth grade, his father died of tuberculosis. Dharun's mother is a school teacher while his sister Sathya plays volleyball for Tamil Nadu.

Dharun completed his schooling at The Century Foundation School in Tirupur where he was coached  by Mr. Alagesan and he never looked back since then. He later  studied B. A. at the Alva's College of Arts in Moodabidri, Karnataka. He represented Tamil Nadu at kho kho before switching to athletics in tenth grade.

Career
Dharun won the 400 metres hurdles gold medal at the 2016 South Asian Games in Guwahati with a time of 50.54 seconds, finishing 0.03 seconds ahead of fellow Indian Jithin Paul whom he overtook at the last hurdle.

In July 2016, Dharun was part of the relay team that broke the national 4 × 400 metres relay record at Bangalore and qualified for the Olympics. The quartet of Dharun, Mohammad Anas, Kunhu Muhammed and Arokia Rajiv clocked 3:00:91, rewriting the national record of 3:02.17 set by themselves four weeks earlier in Turkey. The performance helped the relay team jump to 13th place in the world rankings. It was the third time a men's relay team from India qualified for the Olympics, after 1964 and 2000.

In August 2018, Dharun won the 400 meter hurdles silver medal at the Asian Games in Jakarta with a timing of 48.96 seconds setting a new national record.

References

External links

 
 
 
 

1996 births
Living people
People from Tiruppur district
Indian male sprinters
Athletes from Tamil Nadu
Olympic athletes of India
Athletes (track and field) at the 2016 Summer Olympics
Athletes (track and field) at the 2018 Commonwealth Games
Athletes (track and field) at the 2018 Asian Games
Asian Games silver medalists for India
Asian Games medalists in athletics (track and field)
Medalists at the 2018 Asian Games
Tamil sportspeople
South Asian Games gold medalists for India
South Asian Games medalists in athletics
Commonwealth Games competitors for India